The stripe eel, Aprognathodon platyventris, is a species of eel in the family Ophichthidae. It is the only member of its genus. It is found in the western Atlantic Ocean from the Florida Keys through  the Caribbean islands to Venezuela in reef environments.

References

Ophichthidae
Fish described in 1967